Throat Song is a 2011 Canadian short drama film directed by Miranda de Pencier. The film stars Ippiksaut Friesen as Ippik, an Inuk woman in Nunavut who is trapped in an abusive relationship, and begins to heal her spirit and find her own voice after taking a job as a witness assistant for the government's justice department, aiding other victims of domestic violence.

The film premiered at the 2011 Toronto International Film Festival.

Plot 
The film opens with young Inuk girl Ippik happily running across the tundra to her grandmother and throat singing with her. In Iqaluit, Nunavut, adult Ippik begins work as a witness assistant at the Nunavut Department of Justice, interviewing victims of domestic violence and sexual assault. Her husband Inuusiq is implied to have a drinking problem. Their puppy is tied up outside their house, and Ippik tells him the chain is too short. Despite being physically and verbally affectionate with the puppy, Inuusiq leaves the chain alone.

Ippik starts work and interviews Sam and her mother to confirm their witness statement. Sam's mother confirms the report that her husband fatally stabbed her son during an argument. Ippik talks to Tanner, a teenage boy who was sexually assaulted by his coach, and explains how to give testimony to the crime prosecutor, to his despair. Returning home, Ippik tugs at the puppy's chain in vain to loosen it. Inuusiq accuses Ippik of hiding his alcohol and physically assaults her before having sex with her. He tells her he is going away to hunt for a few days. Ippik stumbles through a court preparation interview with a mother and her young daughter Naja, and realises the rape occurred to Naja. Through a flashback, Ippik is implied to have been sexually assaulted by her uncle as a child.

The interviews with the various victims are interspersed with shots of a young Ippik desperately running through the tundra and culminating in a scream, and of an adult Ippik attempting various forms of suicide such as hanging or wrist cutting.  Later, she attempts to commit suicide with a hunting rifle, but hears the whining of the puppy and shoots its chain instead. Inuusiq returns to find the house empty. Ippik is shown having reclaimed her voice, throat singing as she leads the puppy over the Arctic tundra.

Cast 
 Ippiksaut Friesen as Ippik
 Dodie Netser as young Ippik
 Maata Michael as Inuusiq
 Brian Tagalik as Frankie
 Miali Buscemi as Sam
 Paul Nutarariaq as Tanner 
 Laakkuluk Williamson as hip receptionist
 Ellen Hamilton as government worker
 Jennifer Kilabuk as Jennifer, Naja's mother
 Maya Illnik as Naja
 Beatrice Ikkidluak as Ippik's grandmother
 Allen Auksaq as Ippik's uncle

Accolades
The film won the Canadian Screen Award for Best Live Action Short Drama at the 1st Canadian Screen Awards. The film made the preliminary shortlist of finalists for the Academy Award for Best Live Action Short Film going into the 86th Academy Awards, but was not selected as one of the final five nominees.

References

External links
 

2011 films
2011 drama films
Best Live Action Short Drama Genie and Canadian Screen Award winners
Films set in Nunavut
Films shot in Nunavut
2011 short films
Films about Inuit in Canada
2010s English-language films
Canadian drama short films
2010s Canadian films